Dutson Bombing Range is a bombing range operated by the Royal Australian Air Force (RAAF), located in Victoria. The facility is located near the town of Sale and RAAF Base East Sale.

On August 15, 1962 four Vampire aircraft of the Red Sales display team crashed in the vicinity of the range while doing aerobatics practice. All six men aboard the aircraft were killed instantly.

The site ceased to be used as an active bombing range in 2000.

It has been used as a live firing site for the Australian Army as late as 2010.

In 2018 it was announced that the company DefendTex would construct a facility to manufacture and test propellants and explosives at the range.

See also

List of Royal Australian Air Force installations

References

Military installations in Victoria (Australia)
Bombing ranges
Royal Australian Air Force bases